Kyle Richard Freeland (born May 14, 1993) is an American professional baseball pitcher for the Colorado Rockies of Major League Baseball (MLB). He played college baseball at Evansville and was drafted by the Rockies with the eighth pick in the first round of the 2014 Major League Baseball draft.

Early life 
Freeland was born May 14, 1993, in Denver, Colorado to parents Don and Susan Freeland. He has one older brother, Colin. Freeland played many sports as a young athlete, but excelled in both golf and baseball. He attended Thomas Jefferson High School in Denver, Colorado.

Collegiate career 
Freeland was drafted by the Philadelphia Phillies in the 35th round of the 2011 Major League Baseball draft, but did not sign and attended the University of Evansville.

As a freshman in 2012, Freeland started 14 games, going 4–5 with a 4.55 earned run average (ERA) and 70 strikeouts in 91 innings. As a sophomore in 2013, he again started 14 games, going 4–8 with a 4.34 ERA and 84 strikeouts in  innings. After the season, he played in the Cape Cod League with the Hyannis Harbor Hawks, where he had a 2.25 ERA and 48 strikeouts, and was named a league all-star. As a junior, he was 10–2 with a 1.90 ERA and 128 strikeouts over  innings (14 starts). Following his junior year, he was drafted by the Rockies.

Professional career

Draft and minor leagues
Considered a top prospect for the 2014 Major League Baseball draft, the Colorado Rockies selected Freeland in the first round, with the eighth overall pick, of the 2014 Major League Baseball Draft. Freeland spent 2014 with both the Grand Junction Rockies, and the Asheville Tourists, where he posted a combined 3–0 record with a 1.15 ERA between both teams.

Freeland began the 2015 season with Grand Junction and was later promoted to the Modesto Nuts where he posted a 4.76 ERA. After the season, Freeland was assigned to the Salt River Rafters of the Arizona Fall League. In 2016, Freeland began the season with the Hartford Yard Goats, and was promoted to the Albuquerque Isotopes in June. Freeland posted an 11–10 record with a 3.89 ERA between the two clubs, starting 26 games.

Major leagues

Freeland made his major league debut with the Rockies on April 7, 2017, against the Los Angeles Dodgers, and earned his first win. He also had his first major league hit, a single. His appearance marked the first time in 51 years that a starting pitcher made his Major League debut "in his team's home opener in the state in which he was born"; Chuck Dobson accomplished the feat for the Kansas City Athletics in 1966. Freeland hit his first major league home run on May 21, 2017, against Cincinnati Reds pitcher Bronson Arroyo. On July 9, Freeland took a no-hitter into the 9th inning against the Chicago White Sox before giving up a single to Melky Cabrera with one out. He finished the season with an 11–11 record in 156 innings.

Freeland had a breakout season in 2018. He finished the year by breaking Ubaldo Jimenez's franchise record for single season ERA at 2.84 and ended the year with a record of 17 wins and 7 losses in 33 starts. He struggled badly in his first four starts (going 0–3 with a 5.85 ERA), but went 17–4 with a 2.52 ERA in 29 starts the rest of the season. He also broke the single season franchise record for home ERA at one of the most notorious hitters parks in baseball in Coors Field, finishing with an ERA of 2.40. He pitched  innings in 33 starts while striking out 173 batters against 70 walks and 182 hits, while holding opponents to a .240 batting average. Additionally, 24 of his 33 starts were quality starts, including 11 consecutive quality starts from August 6 to the end of the season. At the conclusion of the season, Freeland finished 4th in Cy Young voting, behind Aaron Nola, Max Scherzer, and winner Jacob deGrom.

Freeland went on to start the 2018 National League Wild Card Game. He pitched 6.2 shutout innings in which he struck out six while allowing four hits and one walk as the Rockies defeated the Chicago Cubs 2–1 in 13 innings, the longest postseason elimination game in baseball history. Freeland also became the first Rockies pitcher to have a scoreless start in a postseason game.

Freeland started the 2019 season going 2–6 with a 7.13 ERA through 12 starts before being demoted to AAA on May 31. He was called back later in the month of June. Freeland ended with a 3–11 record with a 6.73 ERA in 22 starts.

Freeland had a bounce-back season in 2020. Freeland was one of the Rockies most dependable starters in the shortened 60-game season. Despite a poor final outing, in 13 starts, he went 2–3 with a 4.33 ERA, led the NL in quality starts with 9, and led all of MLB in induced double plays with 15. He had the lowest strikeout/walk ratio of all NL qualified pitchers, at 2.0, and finished with a top 10 WAR among National League pitchers, at 2.2. Freeland began the 2021 season on the disabled list, missing the first month of the season. He ended the season with a 7–8 record in 23 starts. He struck out 105 batters in  innings.

In 2022, the Rockies named Freeland their starting pitcher for Opening Day. On April 19, 2022, Freeland agreed to a five-year, $64.5 million contract extension with the Rockies.

In 2022, Freeland was 9-11 with a 4.63 ERA in 31 starts covering 174.2 innings, led the major leagues in sacrifice flies allowed, with nine, and led the majors in triples allowed, with eight. Batters also had an on base percentage against him of .342, the highest against any MLB qualified pitcher.

References

External links

Evansville Purple Aces

1993 births
Living people
Baseball players from Denver
Major League Baseball pitchers
Colorado Rockies players
Evansville Purple Aces baseball players
Grand Junction Rockies players
Asheville Tourists players
Modesto Nuts players
Hartford Yard Goats players
Salt River Rafters players
Albuquerque Isotopes players
Hyannis Harbor Hawks players
Anchorage Glacier Pilots players
2023 World Baseball Classic players